The 2014–15 season was Aston Villa's 23rd season in the Premier League and 27th consecutive season in the top flight of English football, as well as their 140th season as a professional football club. Villa participated in the FA Cup (reaching the final) and League Cup. The club was managed by Paul Lambert, until his sacking on 11 February 2015. He was replaced by Tim Sherwood on 14 February.

Lambert's third season had seen a different approach in the transfer market, with him opting to buy players with experience as opposed to the previous seasons, where the club would sign young prospects. Villa started well, with a 1–0 victory over Stoke City. This was followed by a 0–0 draw against Newcastle United, a 2–1 win over Hull City and a 1–0 victory over Liverpool. During this time, the new back four of Alan Hutton, Ron Vlaar, Philippe Senderos and Aly Cissokho were praised by the manager having gainied three clean sheets out of a possible four, whilst gaining ten points out of an available 12. However, the team then went on to have a five-game long goal drought, losing to Arsenal, Chelsea, Manchester City, Everton and QPR before scoring in a 2–1 loss at Villa Park to Tottenham. Villa then went on to gain some valuable points, drawing 0–0 with West Ham and 1–1 against Southampton. They then won 1–0 against Crystal Palace at Selhurst Park, courtesy of a Christian Benteke goal, followed with a 2–1 victory over Leicester City at Villa Park. On 11 February, Villa announced they had parted company with Lambert after a 2–0 loss at Hull, leaving the club 18th in the Premier League table. 

On 14 February 2015,  the club's official Twitter page announced the appointment of Tim Sherwood as new manager. Sherwood attended the following day's 2–1 win over Leicester City in the FA Cup and gave a half-time team-talk, his first game in official control of the team was at home to Stoke City almost a week later. Villa lost the game 2–1 after a 93rd-minute penalty from Victor Moses. After also losing his second game in charge, this time going down 1–0 to Newcastle United, Sherwood's first win came on 3 March 2015 against West Midlands rivals West Bromwich Albion. The game finished 2–1, with Christian Benteke scoring a last-minute penalty, which shadowed the decision that went against Villa in the Stoke game. Sherwood led Villa to Wembley for the first time since 2010 just four days later, after winning 2–0 in the FA cup quarter-final again against West Bromwich Albion. Sherwood then led Villa to a third straight win, a 4–0 away win over relegation rivals Sunderland in which all goals were scored in the first half. On 19 April 2015, Aston Villa reached the FA Cup Final for the first time since 2000, coming from behind to defeat Liverpool 2–1 in their semi-final at Wembley. However, they went on to lose the final 4–0 to Arsenal.

Key events 

12 May 2014: Randy Lerner announces that he has put the club up for sale after eight years of ownership.
20 May: Academy graduates Marc Albrighton and Nathan Delfouneso are both released from the club.
5 June: The club makes its first summer signing with former Arsenal and Fulham defender Philippe Senderos agreeing to join the club on a free transfer from Valencia.
10 June: Joe Cole joins the club on a free transfer.
1 July: Roy Keane is appointed as the new assistant manager to Paul Lambert, following the dismissal of Ian Culverhouse towards the end of the previous season.
8 July: Chief executive officer Paul Faulkner steps down from his role after failing to reach an agreement on a new non-operational role at the club.
11 July: Kieran Richardson signs for a fee believed to be £600,000 from relegated Fulham.
8 August: Aly Cissokho joins on a four-year deal from Valencia. 
15 August: Colombian Carlos Sánchez arrives at the club for a fee believed to be £4.7 million.
16 August: Villa win 1–0 against Stoke City in the first match of the new season.
21 August: Tom Fox is appointed as the club's new CEO, after five years as Chief Commercial Officer at Arsenal.
27 August: Villa are knocked out of the League Cup after a 1–0 home defeat to Leyton Orient of League One.
2 September: Villa complete a season-long loan for Tom Cleverley from Manchester United, with a view to a permanent move.
17 September: Paul Lambert signs a new contract committing himself to the club until 2018.
4 October: Christian Benteke makes his return after six months out with a ruptured achilles tendon, coming on as a substitute in a 2–0 defeat to Manchester City.
2 November: For the first time since 1967, the club suffers its sixth straight league defeat after losing 2–1 at home to Tottenham Hotspur.
28 November: Roy Keane leaves his role as assistant manager with immediate effect.
13 January 2015: Carles Gil becomes Villa's first January signing after joining the club on a four-and-half year deal.
30 January: Scott Sinclair joins on loan until the end of the season, with a view to a permanent move.
1 February: A 5–0 defeat at Arsenal sees Villa go six league matches (612 minutes) without scoring.
10 February: Villa fall into the drop-zone for the time in the season, after losing 2–0 away to relegation rivals Hull City. This prompts angry scenes from the travelling support towards the manager.
11 February: Paul Lambert is sacked as manager 24 hours after defeat to Hull.
14 February: Tim Sherwood is appointed as the new manager of the club. However, his first match in charge ends in defeat against Stoke City (21 February).
28 February: Villa lose 1–0 to Newcastle United condemning them to a seventh consecutive defeat, beating the six recorded earlier in the season.
3 March: The run of defeats is eventually ended courtesy of a 2–1 victory over local rivals West Bromwich Albion.
7 March: Villa reach Wembley for the first time since 2010 after beating their rivals for the second time in a week. West Bromwich Albion go down 2–0 at Villa Park in the FA Cup quarter-finals.
14 March: The club records its biggest victory of the season, 4–0 away against Sunderland. All four goals were scored before half-time.
7 April: Christian Benteke scores a hat-trick to salvage a 3–3 draw against fellow relegation candidates Queens Park Rangers.
11 April: Villa beat Tottenham Hotspur 1–0 at White Hart Lane in Tim Sherwood's first game against his former employers.
20 April: The club reaches the FA Cup Final after a 2–1 win against Liverpool at Wembley Stadium. Christian Benteke and Fabian Delph scored the goals to take Villa to the prestigious final for the first time since 2000.
16 May: Despite being thrashed 6–1 at Southampton, Villa's Premier League safety is confirmed after Hull City lose to Tottenham Hotspur.
24 May: Villa end the season in 17th place in the Premier League, their second lowest finish since its inception, after a final day defeat to already relegated Burnley.

Players

Transfers

In 
Summer

Winter/Spring

Out 

Summer

1Fee officially undisclosed

Winter

Loans

In 

Summer

Winter

Out 

Summer

Winter/Spring

Competitions

Pre-season and friendlies

Premier League

League table

Result summary

Results by matchday

Matches

FA Cup

League Cup

Statistics

Overall

Appearances 
{| class="wikitable" style="font-size: 100%; text-align: center;"
|-
|rowspan="2" |Number
|rowspan="2" |Nation
|rowspan="2" ; width=95% |Name
|colspan="2" |Premier League
|colspan="2" |FA Cup
|colspan="2" |League Cup
|colspan="2" |Total
|colspan="1" |Notes
|-
!width=60 |Start
!width=60 |Sub
!width=60 |Start
!width=60 |Sub
!width=60 |Start
!width=60 |Sub
!width=60 |Start
!width=60 |Sub
!width=120|
|-
!colspan=12 |Goalkeepers
|-
|1 || ||Guzan|| 34 || – || – || – || – || – || 34 || 0 ||
|-
|13 || ||Steer|| 1 || – || – || – || – || – || 1 || 0 ||
|-
|31 || ||Given|| 3 || – || 5 || – || 1 || – || 9 || 0 ||
|-
!colspan=12 |Defenders
|-
|2 || ||Baker|| 7 || 3 || 1 || – || 1 || – || 9 || 3 ||
|-
|3 || ||Bennett|| – || – || – || – || – || – || 0 || 0 ||
|-
|4 || ||Vlaar|| 20 || 1 || 1 || – || – || – || 21 || 1 ||
|-
|5 || ||Okore|| 22 || 1 || 3 || 1 || – || – || 25 || 2 ||
|-
|6 || ||Clark|| 23 || 2 || 4 || – || – || – || 27 || 2 ||
|-
|14 || ||Senderos|| 7 || 1 || – || – || 1 || – || 8 || 1 ||
|-
|21 || ||Hutton|| 27 || 3 || 3 || – || 1 || – || 31 || 3 ||
|-
|23 || ||Cissokho|| 24 || 1 || 2 || – || – || – || 26 || 1 ||
|-
|32 || ||Donacien|| – || – || – || – || – || – || 0 || 0 ||
|-
|34 || ||Lowton|| 8 || 4 || 1 || – || – || – || 9 || 4 ||
|-
|35 || ||Stevens|| – || – || – || – || – || – || 0 || 0 ||
|-
|– || ||Luna|| – || – || – || – || – || – || 0 || 0 ||
|-
!colspan=12 |Midfielders
|-
|7 || ||Bacuna|| 10 || 9 || 5 || – || 1 || – || 16 || 9 ||
|- 
|8 || ||Cleverley|| 31 || – || 5 || – || – || – || 36 || 0 ||
|-
|9 || ||Sinclair|| 5 || 4 || 1 || 2 || – || – || 6 || 6 ||
|-
|12 || ||Cole|| 3 || 7 || 1 || 1 || 1 || – || 5 || 8 ||
|-
|15 || ||Westwood|| 25 || 2 || 4 || 1 || 1 || – || 29 || 3 ||
|-
|16 || ||Delph|| 28 || – || 2 || – || – || – || 30 || 1 ||
|-
|17 || ||Herd|| – || – || – || – || – || – || 0 || 0 ||
|-
|18 || ||Richardson|| 16 || 6 || 2 || – || 1 || – || 19 || 6 ||
|-
|22 || ||Gardner|| – || – || – || – || – || – || 0 || 0 ||
|-
|24 || ||Sánchez|| 21 || 7 || 2 || 1 || 1 || – || 23 || 9 ||
|-
|25 || ||Gil|| 5 || 1 || 1 || 1 || – || – || 7 || 1 ||
|-
|28 || ||N'Zogbia|| 19 || 8 || 2 || 1 || – || – || 21 || 9 ||
|-
|36 || ||Johnson|| – || – || – || – || – || – || 0 || 0 ||
|-
|39 || ||Calder|| – || – || – || – || – || – || 0 || 0 ||
|-
|40 || ||Grealish|| 7 || 10 || 2 || 3 || 1 || – || 10 || 13 ||
|-
|– || ||Sylla|| – || – || – || – || – || – || 0 || 0 ||
|-
|– || ||Tonev|| – || – || – || – || – || – || 0 || 0 ||
|-
!colspan=12 |Forwards
|-
|10 || ||Weimann|| 20 || 11 || 2 || 1 || – || 1 || 22 || 13 ||
|-
|11 || ||Agbonlahor|| 30 || 4 || 1 || – || – || – || 31 || 4 ||
|-
|19 || ||Bent|| – || 7 || – || – || 1 || – || 1 || 7 ||
|-
|20 || ||Benteke|| 26 || 3 || 4 || – || – || – || 30 || 3 ||
|-
|27 || ||Kozák|| – || – || – || – || – || – || 0 || 0 ||
|-
|29 || ||Hepburn-Murphy|| – || 1 || – || – || – || – || 0 || 1 ||
|-
|37 || ||Robinson|| – || – || – || – || – || – || 0 || 0 ||
|-
|– || ||Helenius|| – || – || – || – || – || – || 0 || 0 ||

Notes

Goalscorers 

Correct as of 24 May 2015
Players with the same number of goals are listed by their position on the club's official website Source
  Players highlighted in light grey denote the player had scored for the club before leaving for another club
  Players highlighted in light cyan denote the player has scored for the club after arriving at Aston Villa during the season
  Players highlighted in Blonde denote the player has scored for the club before leaving the club on loan for part/the rest of the season

Disciplinary record 

Correct as of 24 May 2015 
Players are listed in descending order of 
Players with the same number of cards are listed by their position on the club's official website Source
  Players highlighted in light grey denote the player has received a yellow/red card for the club before leaving for another club
  Players highlighted in light cyan denote the player has received a yellow/red card for the club after arriving at Aston Villa during the season
  Players highlighted in Blonde denote the player has received a yellow/red card for the club before leaving the club on loan for part/the rest of the season

Notes
1Red card rescinded by the FA on 23/12/14.2Cleverley received one yellow card whilst playing for Manchester United (not included in this total).

Suspensions

Clean sheets 

Includes all competitive matches.

Injuries 

Players in bold are still out from their injuries.  Players listed will/have miss(ed) at least one competitive game (missing from whole matchday squad).

 'Return date' is date that player returned to any AV match day squad.

Awards

Club awards
At the end of the season, Aston Villa's annual award ceremony, including categories voted for by the players and backroom staff, the supporters and the supporters club, saw the following players recognised for their achievements for the club throughout the 2014–15 season.

Divisional awards

References

Aston Villa
Aston Villa F.C. seasons